Nosratabad-e Seh Dangeh (also Romanized as Noşratābād-e Seh Dāngeh) is a village in Soghan Rural District, Soghan District, Arzuiyeh County, Kerman Province, Iran. At the 2006 census, its population was 313, in 53 families.

References 

Populated places in Arzuiyeh County